San Sebastián School is a Chilean primary and secondary located in Rancagua, Cachapoal Province, Chile.

The school was created by the Sociedad San Sebastián, represented by Guillermo Olave Castillo and Luis Aravena Pereira, on 3 March 2003. Its current principal is Luis Rojas Caro. The president of the parents' center (centro de padres) is Paola Choapa Rojas.

References

External links
 Official website 

Educational institutions established in 2003
Secondary schools in Chile
Schools in Cachapoal Province
Primary schools in Chile
2003 establishments in Chile